Polyfill may refer to:

 Polyester fiberfill, also known as Poly-fil or polyfill, a synthetic fiber
 Polyfill (programming), in web development, code that implements a feature on web browsers that do not support the feature
 In graphics programming, the use of flood fill for filling polygons
 Polyfilla, a DIY spackling paste product